John Perceval (1923–2000) was an Australian artist.

John Perceval may also refer to:
Sir John Perceval, 1st Baronet (1629–1665), land owner in Ireland; knighted by Henry Cromwell and later made a baronet by Charles II
John Perceval, 1st Earl of Egmont (1683–1748), grandson of the 1st Baronet; Anglo-Irish politician
John Perceval, 2nd Earl of Egmont  (1711–1770), British politician, and First Lord of the Admiralty
John Perceval, 3rd Earl of Egmont (1738–1822), British politician
John Perceval, 4th Earl of Egmont (1767–1835), British peer and politician
John Thomas Perceval (1803–1876), British army officer and lunacy law reform campaigner

See also
John Percival (disambiguation)